This is a list of listed buildings in Argyll and Bute. The list is split out by parish.

 List of listed buildings in Ardchattan And Muckairn, Argyll and Bute
 List of listed buildings in Arrochar, Argyll and Bute
 List of listed buildings in Bonhill, Argyll and Bute
 List of listed buildings in Campbeltown, Argyll and Bute
 List of listed buildings in Cardross, Argyll and Bute
 List of listed buildings in Coll, Argyll and Bute
 List of listed buildings in Colonsay And Oronsay, Argyll and Bute
 List of listed buildings in Cove And Kilcreggan, Argyll and Bute
 List of listed buildings in Craignish, Argyll and Bute
 List of listed buildings in Dunoon And Kilmun, Argyll and Bute
 List of listed buildings in Dunoon, Argyll and Bute
 List of listed buildings in Gigha And Cara, Argyll and Bute
 List of listed buildings in Glenorchy And Inishail, Argyll and Bute
 List of listed buildings in Helensburgh, Argyll and Bute
 List of listed buildings in Inveraray, Argyll and Bute
 List of listed buildings in Inverchaolain, Argyll and Bute
 List of listed buildings in Jura, Argyll and Bute
 List of listed buildings in Kilbrandon And Kilchattan, Argyll and Bute
 List of listed buildings in Kilcalmonell, Argyll and Bute
 List of listed buildings in Kilchoman, Argyll and Bute
 List of listed buildings in Kilchrenan And Dalavich, Argyll and Bute
 List of listed buildings in Kildalton And Oa, Argyll and Bute
 List of listed buildings in Kilfinan, Argyll and Bute
 List of listed buildings in Kilfinichen And Kilvickeon, Argyll and Bute
 List of listed buildings in Killarow And Kilmeny, Argyll and Bute
 List of listed buildings in Killean And Kilchenzie, Argyll and Bute
 List of listed buildings in Kilmartin, Argyll and Bute
 List of listed buildings in Kilmichael Glassary, Argyll and Bute
 List of listed buildings in Kilmodan, Argyll and Bute
 List of listed buildings in Kilmore And Kilbride, Argyll and Bute
 List of listed buildings in Kilninian And Kilmore, Argyll and Bute
 List of listed buildings in Kilninver And Kilmelford, Argyll and Bute
 List of listed buildings in Kingarth, Argyll and Bute
 List of listed buildings in Lismore And Appin, Argyll and Bute
 List of listed buildings in Lochgilphead, Argyll and Bute
 List of listed buildings in Lochgoilhead And Kilmorich, Argyll and Bute
 List of listed buildings in Luss, Argyll and Bute
 List of listed buildings in North Bute, Argyll and Bute
 List of listed buildings in North Knapdale, Argyll and Bute
 List of listed buildings in Oban, Argyll and Bute
 List of listed buildings in Rhu, Argyll and Bute
 List of listed buildings in Rosneath, Argyll and Bute
 List of listed buildings in Rothesay, Argyll and Bute
 List of listed buildings in Saddell And Skipness, Argyll and Bute
 List of listed buildings in South Knapdale, Argyll and Bute
 List of listed buildings in Southend, Argyll and Bute
 List of listed buildings in Strachur, Argyll and Bute
 List of listed buildings in Strathlachlan, Argyll and Bute
 List of listed buildings in Tiree, Argyll and Bute
 List of listed buildings in Tobermory, Argyll and Bute
 List of listed buildings in Torosay, Argyll and Bute

Argyll and Bute